This is a list of films which placed number-one at the box office in Australia during 2004. Amounts are in Australian dollars. Also included are the positions at the box office other films opened at. Quite a number of these are films from the previous year due to normal Australian film distribution delays.

References
Urban Cinefile – Box Office

See also
 List of Australian films – Australian films by year
 2004 in film

2004
Australia
2004 in Australian cinema